The 2000–01 NCAA Division III men's ice hockey season began on October 20, 2000 and concluded on March 17 of the following year. This was the 28th season of Division III college ice hockey.

Regular season

Season tournaments

Standings

Note: Mini-game are not included in final standings

2001 NCAA tournament

Note: * denotes overtime period(s)

See also
 2000–01 NCAA Division I men's ice hockey season

References

External links

 
NCAA